Esat Duraku (born 16 January 1936) is an Albanian chess player, five-time Albanian Chess Championship winner (1954, 1955, 1956, 1958, 1963).

Biography
From the mid-1950s to the end of 1960s Esat Duraku was one of Albania's leading chess players. He five time won Albanian Chess Championship: 1954, 1955, 1956, 1958, and 1963.

Esat Duraku played for Albania in the Chess Olympiads:
 In 1962, at second board in the 15th Chess Olympiad in Varna (+5, =8, -3),
 In 1970, at second board in the 19th Chess Olympiad in Siegen (+5, =5, -6).

Esat Duraku played for Albania in the World Student Team Chess Championship:
 In 1958, at second board in the 5th World Student Team Chess Championship in Varna (+2, =4, -4).

After 1970 Esat Duraku did not participate in international chess tournaments.

References

External links

Esat Duraku chess games at 365chess.com

1936 births
Living people
Albanian chess players
Chess Olympiad competitors
20th-century chess players